The Street is a 1976 animated short by Caroline Leaf, based on a short story of the same name by Mordecai Richler, and produced by the National Film Board of Canada.

Summary
Animated using paint on glass animation, and set on Saint Urbain Street in Montreal, it explores the reactions of Jewish family in the early 20th century to the death of a grandmother.

Production
The film had a budget of $49,223.

Awards
The Street garnered numerous awards including a special prize from the Melbourne International Film Festival, the Grand Prize at the Ottawa International Animation Festival and two Canadian Film Awards (now known as the Genie Awards) for Best Animated Film and the Wendy Michener Award, presented in recognition of outstanding artistic achievement in Canadian cinema. It was also nominated for the Academy Award for Best Animated Short Film at the 49th Academy Awards.

References

Works cited

External links
Watch The Street at NFB.ca

The Street on Animation Show of Shows

1976 films
National Film Board of Canada animated short films
Films based on short fiction
Films set in Montreal
Films about Jews and Judaism
Films directed by Caroline Leaf
Jewish Canadian films
Quebec films
Paint-on-glass animated films
Films based on works by Mordecai Richler
Best Animated Short Film Genie and Canadian Screen Award winners
Films about death
1970s animated short films
1976 animated films
Films produced by Guy Glover
Canadian animated short films
Films about children
1976 short films
English-language Canadian films
1970s English-language films
1970s Canadian films